The Czech Republic, presented as Czechia, is set to participate in the Eurovision Song Contest 2023 in Liverpool, United Kingdom, with "My Sister's Crown" performed by Vesna. The Czech broadcaster Česká televize (ČT) organised the national final ESCZ 2023 in order to select the Czech entry for the 2023 contest.

Background 

The nation competed in the contest on three consecutive occasions between 2007 and 2009 without qualifying to the final. In , the country qualified for the final with the song "Lights Off" performed by We Are Domi, placing 22nd with 38 points.

The Czech national broadcaster, Česká televize (ČT) broadcasts the event within the Czech Republic and organizes the selection process for the nation's entry. The broadcaster has used both national finals and internal selections to select the Czech Eurovision entries in the past. ČT confirmed their intention to participate at the 2023 Eurovision Song Contest in October 2022. The broadcaster later confirmed that the Czech entry for the 2023 contest would be selected through a national final.

Before Eurovision

ESCZ 2023 

ESCZ 2023 was the national final organized by ČT in order to select the Czech entry for the Eurovision Song Contest 2023. The show was hosted by Czech singer and actor  and was broadcast via the Eurovision Song Contest's YouTube channel and ČT's online streaming platform iVysílání. This marked the first time in 15 years that the Czech Republic used a live show to determine their participant.

Competing entries 

Artists and composers were able to submit their proposals to the broadcaster between 2 November 2022 and 8 December 2022. Artists were required to have Czech citizenship and for groups of a maximum of six members, at least one of the lead vocalists were required to have Czech citizenship. Songwriters of any nationality were able to submit songs. The broadcaster received more than 170 submissions at the closing of the deadline, mostly from Czech composers. Initially, it was announced that three entries would be selected to compete in the national final. However, it was later revealed by Kryštof Šámal, the Czech head of delegation, that five entries were selected to compete. The five competing artists were revealed on 16 January 2023.

Final 
Five entries competed in the national final and the winner was determined solely by a public vote via the Eurovision Song Contest app, which consisted of 70% international audiences and 30% Czech audiences. The voting window was open from 30 January to 6 February 2023, and the winner was announced on 7 February 2023.

At Eurovision 
According to Eurovision rules, all nations with the exceptions of the host country and the "Big Five" (France, Germany, Italy, Spain and the United Kingdom) are required to qualify from one of two semi-finals in order to compete for the final; the top ten countries from each semi-final progress to the final. The European Broadcasting Union (EBU) split up the competing countries into six different pots based on voting patterns from previous contests, with countries with favourable voting histories put into the same pot. On 31 January 2023, an allocation draw was held, which placed each country into one of the two semi-finals, and determined which half of the show they would perform in. The Czech Republic has been placed into the first semi-final, to be held on 9 May 2023, and has been scheduled to perform in the second half of the show.

References 

2023
Countries in the Eurovision Song Contest 2023
Eurovision